Unreleased Quicksilver Messenger Service — Lost Gold and Silver is a compilation album by American psychedelic rock band Quicksilver Messenger Service. The album is made up of the European 2-LP release Maiden of the Cancer Moon from 1983, two tracks from the 1967 soundtrack album Revolution, both sides from a non-LP single released in late 1968 and some studio outtakes from the late 1960s.

Track listing

Disc one
"Live from 1968"
"Back Door Man" – 4:15
"Codine" – 6:14
"Gold & Silver" – 12:02
"Smokestack Lightning" – 10:15
"Light Your Windows" – 3:06
"Dino's Song" – 3:32
"The Fool" – 13:15
"Who Do You Love?" – 12:21
"Mona/Maiden of the Cancer Moon/Mona" – 11:34

Bonus disc
"Studio"
"I Don't Want to Spoil Your Party (Dino's Song)" – 3:06
"Acapulco Gold and Silver (Gold and Silver)" – 2:37
"I Hear You Knockin'" – 3:12
"Back Door Man" – 4:00
"Your Time Will Come" – 3:10
"Who Do You Love (Part 1)" – 5:58
"Walkin' Blues" – 3:07
"Calvary" – 6:32
"Codine" – 5:22
"Babe I'm Gonna Leave You" – 5:06
"Stand by Me" – 3:35
"The Bears" – 2:11

Personnel
 John Cipollinavocals, guitar
 Gary Duncanvocals, guitar
 David Freibergvocals, bass guitar, viola
 Greg Elmoredrums

Notes

Quicksilver Messenger Service albums
1999 compilation albums